A list of films produced by the Tollywood (Bengali language film industry) based in Kolkata in the year 1998.

Highest-grossing
Ranokhetro

A-Z of films

References
 3. www.bangodarshan.com - samaj - chalachchitra

External links
 Tollywood films of 1998 at the Internet Movie Database

1998
Bengali
 Bengali
1998 in Indian cinema